Rhyncholaelia glauca is a species of orchid occurring from Mexico to Belize, Guatemala and southeastern Honduras.

References 

 Rhyncholaelia glauca at the Internet Orchid Species Photo Encyclopedia

External links 

glauca
Orchids of Central America
Orchids of Belize
Orchids of Guatemala
Orchids of Honduras
Orchids of Mexico